Caragh Lake railway station was on the Great Southern and Western Railway which ran from Farranfore to Valentia Harbour in the Republic of Ireland.

History
The station was opened on 12 September 1893.

The station closed on 1 February 1960.

References 

Disused railway stations in County Kerry
Railway stations opened in 1893
Railway stations closed in 1960
Farranfore–Valentia Harbour line